Jinhai Road is a Shanghai Metro station in the Pudong New Area of Shanghai. Located at the intersection of Jinhai Road and Jinsui Road, it serves as an interchange station between Lines 9 and 12 and the current eastern terminus of Line 12.

The station first opened as the eastern terminus of the first phase of Line 12 on 29 December 2013.

Station Layout

References

Railway stations in Shanghai
Shanghai Metro stations in Pudong
Railway stations in China opened in 2013
Line 9, Shanghai Metro
Line 12, Shanghai Metro